Balâtre is a village of Wallonia and a district of the municipality of Jemeppe-sur-Sambre, located in the province of Namur, Belgium.

Balâtre was its own municipality until the fusion of the Belgian municipalities in 1977 when it merged with Jemeppe-sur-Sambre. Balâtre is on the northern bank of the river Ligny.

History
The village of Balâtre was a location defended by the Prussian army throughout the Battle of Ligny on 16 June 1815.

Notes

References

External links

Former municipalities of Namur (province)
Battle of Ligny locations